Moustafa or Moustapha Safouan (17 May 1921–7 November 2020) was an Egyptian psychoanalyst.

Life
Born in Alexandria, Safouan was the son of a teacher and trade unionist who was imprisoned for several years for his political activity in 1924. After studying philosophy in Alexandria, and unable to gain a place to study at Cambridge University in the aftermath of the war, he went to Paris to study philosophy in 1946. After entering analysis with Marc Schlumberger, he underwent a training analysis with Jacques Lacan in 1949. He attended Lacan's seminars in the early 1950s, though was forced to stay in Egypt for several years after Nasser came to power. Returning to France in 1959, he was sent by the Lacanian Société Française as a training analyst to Strasbourg.

His book Why are the Arabs Not Free argues that Arabic culture and politics are held back by the lack of regard given to vernacular Arabics.

Safouan died on 7 November 2020. He was 99 years old.

Works
 Le structuralisme en psychanalyse, 1968
 Études sur l'Œdipe: introduction à une théorie du sujet, 1974
 La sexualité féminine dans la doctrine freudienne, 1976
 L'échec du principe du plaisir, 1979. Translated by Martin Thom as Pleasure and being: hedonism, from a psychoanalytic point of view, 1983.
 Jacques Lacan et la question de la formation des analystes, 1983. Translated by Jacqueline Rose as Jacques Lacan and the question of psychoanalytic training, 1999
 La parole ou la mort: comment une société humaine est-elle possible?, 1993. Translated by Martin Thom, with an introduction by Colin MacCabe, as Speech or death? Language as social order: a psychoanalytic study, 2002.
 Four lessons of psychoanalysis, 2004
 Why are the Arabs not Free? the politics of writing, 2007
 La Civilisation Post-oedipidienne, 2017

References

External links
 Moustapha Safouan, On the Formation of the Psychoanalyst, November 2003
 Moustapha Safouan, Questions Concerning Feminine Sexuality, 16 October 2004

1921 births
2020 deaths
Egyptian psychiatrists
French psychoanalysts
Analysands of Jacques Lacan
People from Alexandria
Egyptian expatriates in France